Edward Henry Delafield (December 23, 1880 – December 2, 1955) was a Connecticut politician and prominent landowner.

Early life
Delafield was born in New York, New York on December 23, 1880. He was the son of Dr. Francis Delafield (1841–1915) and Katherine Van Rensselaer (d. 1901), a granddaughter of Stephen Van Rensselaer III, the patroon of Rensselaerwyck.  Edward Henry Delafield's sister Julia Floyd Crosby (b. 1874) was the grandmother of musician David Crosby.

Delafield graduated from St. Paul's School in Concord, New Hampshire and later, Yale University, in 1902, where his father also graduated from in 1860.

Career
In 1921, at the age of 41, Edward Henry Delafield inherited a large farm In Darien, Connecticut. He retired as a broker, from the New York Stock Exchange, in 1930, and entered the real estate and insurance business.

In 1944, he was elected as a Representative to the Connecticut State Legislature and was reelected in 1946.  He developed the Darien Theater block, the first Seagate subdivision and the early North Stamford properties.

He founded Delafield Island and the Delafield Island Association.  He was president of the Weeburn Country Club, and Darien Deputy Sheriff. His summer home was called Sunswick.

Personal life
In October 1904, he married Winifred Folsom (1882–1927), a descendant of Peter Stuyvesant, who was the fifth daughter of George Winthrop Folsom (1846–1915) of Lenox, Massachusetts, and the granddaughter of George Folsom. They lived in Darien, Connecticut and the marriage produced four daughters:

 Winifred Folsom Delafield (1906-1983), who first married Donald McL. Frothingham in 1926. They divorced in 1934, and later that same year, she married Francis Ernest Gay.
 Elizabeth Van Rensselaer Delafield (1908-1983), who first married Robert H. Spurgeon in 1929.  She later married Frank A. Zunino Jr. (d. 1975)
 Frances Katherine Delafield (1913-1995), who first married Edgar L. Stone in 1933.  She later married W. W. Johns
 Georgette Winthrop Delafield (b. 1914), who first married Lawrence Logan Bevans in 1935. After their divorce in October 1938, she married Floyd W. Jefferson, Jr. in 1939. He was previously married to Eleanor J. Alsop. Richard Barrett

Delafield died on December 2, 1955 in Stamford, Connecticut.

References

1880 births
1955 deaths
Cornell family
Van Rensselaer family
Members of the Connecticut House of Representatives
Delafield family